Giulio Monteverde (8 October 1837 – 3 October 1917) was an Italian naturalist sculptor and teacher.

Biography
Monteverde was born in Bistagno, Italy and studied at the Academy of Fine Arts in Rome. He later became a professor there. 
Among his students were Yulia Brazol, Lola Mora and Victor de Pol, who both developed significant public work in Buenos Aires.

He was made an Officer in the Legion d'Honneur in 1878 and an Italian Senator in 1889.  He died in Rome in 1917, five days shy of his 80th birthday.

Principal works

 Bambini che giocano con il gatto (Children playing with a cat), (1867)
 Pantheon of the Marquess of la Gándara: marbel angel, San Isidro Cemetery, Madrid
 Monument to Raffaele Pratolongo, (1868) – Genoa, Monumental Cemetery of Staglieno
 Colombo giovinetto (The boy Columbus) (1870)
 Genio di Franklin (Franklin’s genius) (1871)
 Jenner colto nell'atto di inoculare il vaccino del vaiolo al proprio figlio (Jenner vaccinating his own son against smallpox) (1873) – Rome, Galleria Nazionale d'Arte Moderna
 Monument to Giuseppe Mazzini (1879) – Buenos Aires, Argentina
 Cristo morto (Christ dead') (1880) – Buenos Aires, Recoleta Cemetery, Argentina
 Monument to Francesco Oneto (1882) – Genoa, Monumental Cemetery of Staglieno
 Monument to Vincenzo Bellini (1882) - Catania, Piazza Stesicoro
 Angelo della Resurrezione (1882) – Genoa, Monumental Cemetery of Staglieno
 Tomba Celle (Cell tomb) (1893) – Genoa, Monumental Cemetery of Staglieno
 Idealità e materialismo (Idealism and materialism) (1911) – Rome, Galleria Nazionale d'Arte Moderna
 Il pensiero (The thought) – Rome, Vittoriano
 Monument to Vittorio Emanuele II – Rovigo

Two of his angel statues are among the most copied in the world of funerary art; the angel in Staglieno Cemetery known as the Angelo della Resurrezione (The Resurrection Angel), and the angel in Rome's Verano Cemetery known as the Angel of the Night. There are three of the Resurrection Angel in the New York City area, and three of the Angel of the Night in the San Francisco Bay Area in California. Monteverde also created a Resurrection Angel for his own family tomb in Verano Cemetery in Rome.

Sources

 The corresponding article in the Italian Wikipedia as it stood on 6 August 2006
 Giulio Monteverde

External links

 The gipsoteca (gallery of plaster casts) of Giulio Monteverde in Bistagno 
 
 Statue of Giuseppe Saracco, Acqui Terme 

1837 births
1917 deaths
People from the Province of Alessandria
Members of the Senate of the Kingdom of Italy
Officiers of the Légion d'honneur
Recipients of the Pour le Mérite (civil class)
20th-century Italian sculptors
20th-century Italian male artists
19th-century Italian sculptors
Italian male sculptors
19th-century Italian male artists